Provenance in geology, is the reconstruction of the origin of sediments. The Earth is a dynamic planet, and all rocks are subject to transition between the three main rock types: sedimentary, metamorphic, and igneous rocks (the rock cycle). Rocks exposed to the surface are sooner or later broken down into sediments. Sediments are expected to be able to provide evidence of the erosional history of their parent source rocks. The purpose of provenance study is to restore the tectonic, paleo-geographic and paleo-climatic history.

In the modern geological lexicon, "sediment provenance" specifically refers to the application of compositional analyses to determine the origin of sediments. This is often used in conjunction with the study of exhumation histories, interpretation of drainage networks and their evolution, and forward-modelling of paleo-earth systems. In combination, these help to characterise the "source to sink" journey of clastic sediments from hinterland to sedimentary basin.

Introduction 

Provenance (from the French provenir, "to come from"), is the place of origin or earliest known history of something. In geology (specifically, in sedimentary petrology), the term provenance deals with the question where sediments originate from. The purpose of sedimentary provenance studies is to reconstruct and to interpret the history of sediment from parent rocks at a source area to detritus at a burial place. The ultimate goal of provenance studies is to investigate the characteristics of a source area by analyzing the composition and texture of sediments. The studies of provenance involve the following aspects: "(1) the source(s) of the particles that make up the rocks, (2) the erosion and transport mechanisms that moved the particles from source areas to depositional sites, (3) the depositional setting and depositional processes responsible for sedimentation of the particles (the depositional environment), and (4) the physical and chemical conditions of the burial environment and diagenetic changes that occur in siliciclastic sediment during burial and uplift". Provenance studies are conducted to investigate many scientific questions, for example, the growth history of continental crust, collision time of Indian and Asian plates, Asian monsoon intensity, and Himalayan exhumation Meanwhile, the provenance methods are widely used in the oil and gas industry. "Relations between provenance and basin are important for hydrocarbon exploration because sand frameworks of contrasting detrital compositions respond differently to diagenesis, and thus display different trends of porosity reduction with depth of burial."

Source of detritus 
All rock exposed at the Earth's surface is subjected to physical or chemical weathering and broken down into finer grained sediment. All three types of rocks (igneous, sedimentary and metamorphic rocks) can be the source of detritus.

Transportation of detritus 

Rocks are transported downstream from higher elevation to lower elevation. Source rocks and detritus are transported by gravity, water, wind or glacial movement. The transportation process breaks rocks into smaller particles by physical abrasion, from big boulder size into sand or even clay size. At the same time minerals within the sediment can also be changed chemically. Only minerals that are more resistant to chemical weathering can survive (e.g. ultrastable minerals zircon, tourmaline and rutile). During the transportation, minerals can be sorted by their density, and as a result, light minerals like quartz and mica can be moved faster and further than heavy minerals (like zircon and tourmaline).

Accumulation of detritus 

After a certain distance of transportation, detritus reaches a sedimentary basin and accumulates in one place. With the accumulation of sediments, sediments are buried to a deeper level and go through diagenesis, which turns separate sediments into sedimentary rocks (i.e. conglomerate, sandstone, mudrocks, limestone etc.) and some metamorphic rocks (such as quartzite) which were derived from sedimentary rocks. After sediments are weathered and eroded from mountain belts, they can be carried by stream and deposited along rivers as river sands. Detritus can also be transported and deposited in foreland basins and at offshore fans. The detrital record can be collected from all these places and can be used in provenance studies.

Reworking of detritus 
After detritus are eroded from source area, they are transported and deposited in river, foreland basin or flood plain. Then the detritus can be eroded and transported again when flooding or other kinds of eroding events occur. This process is called as reworking of detritus. And this process could be problematic to provenance studies. For example, U-Pb zircon ages are generally considered to reflect the time of zircon crystallization at about 750° Celsius and zircon is resistant to physical abrasion and chemical weathering. So zircon grains can survive from multiple cycles of reworking. This means if the zircon grain is reworked (re-eroded) from a foreland basin (not from original mountain belt source area) it will lose information of reworking (detrital record will not indicate the foreland basin as a source area but will indicate the earlier mountain belt as a source area). To avoid this problem, samples can be collected close to the mountain front, upstream from which there is no significant sediment storage.

Development of provenance methods 
The study of sedimentary provenance involves several geological disciplines, including mineralogy, geochemistry, geochronology, sedimentology, igneous and metamorphic petrology. The development of provenance methods are heavily dependent on the development of these mainstream geological disciplines. The earliest provenance studies were primarily based on paleocurrent analysis and petrographic analysis (composition and texture of sandstone and conglomerate). Since the 1970s, provenance studies shifted to interpret tectonic settings (i.e. magmatic arcs, collision orogens and continental blocks) using sandstone composition. Similarly, bulk rock geochemistry techniques are applied to interpret provenance linking geochemical signatures to source rocks and tectonic settings. Later, with the development of chemical and isotopic micro-analysis methods and geochronological techniques(e.g. ICP-MS, SHRIMP), provenance researches shifted to analyze single mineral grains. The following table has examples of where provenance study samples are collected.

Provenance methods 

Generally, provenance methods can be sorted into two categories, which are petrological methods and geochemical methods. Examples of petrological methods include QFL ternary diagram, heavy mineral assemblages (apatite–tourmaline index, garnet zircon index), clay mineral assemblages and illite crystallinity, reworked fossils and palynomorphs, and stock magnetic properties. Examples of geochemical methods include zircon U-Pb dating (plus Hf isotope), zircon fission track, apatite fission track, bulk sediment Nd and Sr isotopes, garnet chemistry, pyroxene chemistry, amphibole chemistry and so on. There is a more detailed list below with references to various types of provenance methods.

Examples of provenance methods

Sandstone composition and plate tectonics 

This method is widely used in provenance studies and it has the ability to link sandstone composition to tectonic setting. This method is described in the Dickinson and Suczek 1979 paper. Detrital framework modes of sandstone suites from different kinds of basins are a function of provenance types governed by plate tectonics. (1)Quartzose sands from continental cratons are widespread within interior basins, platform successions, miogeoclinal wedges, and opening ocean basins. (2)Arkosic sands from uplifted basement blocks are present locally in rift troughs and in wrench basins related to transform ruptures. (3)Volcaniclastic lithic sand and more complex volcano-plutonic sands derived from magmatic arcs are present in trenches, forearc basins and marginal seas. (4) Recycled orogenic sands, rich in quartz or chert plus other lithic fragments and derived from subduction complexes, collision orogens, and foreland uplifts, are present in closing ocean basins. Triangular diagrams showing framework proportions of quartz, the two feldspars, polycrystalline quartzose lithics, and unstable lithics of volcanic and sedimentary parentage successfully distinguish the key provenance types."

Resolving provenance problems by dating detrital minerals 

Geochronology and thermochronology are more and more applied to solve provenance and tectonic problems. Detrital minerals used in this method include zircons, monazites, white micas and apatites. The age dated from these minerals indicate timing of crystallization and multiple tectono-thermal events. This method is base on the following considerations: "(1) the source areas are characterized by rocks with different tectonic histories recorded by distinctive crystallization and cooling ages; (2) the source rocks contain the selected mineral;"  (3) Detrital mineral like zircon is ultra-stable which means it is capable of surviving multiple phases of physical and chemical weathering, erosion and deposition. This property make these detrital mineral ideal to record long history of crystallization of tectonically complex source area.

The figure to the right is an example of U–Pb relative age probability diagram. The upper plot shows foreland basin detrital zircon age distribution. The lower plot shows hinterland (source area) zircon age distribution. In the plots, n is the number of analyzed zircon grains. So for foreland basin Amile formation, 74 grains are analyzed. For source area (divided into 3 tectonic level, Tethyan Himalaya, Greater Himalaya and Lesser Himalaya), 962, 409 and 666 grains are analyzed respectively. To correlate hinterland and foreland data, let's see the source area record first, Tethyan sequence have age peak at ~500 Myr, 1000 Myr and 2600 Myr, Greater Himalaya has age peaks at ~1200 Myr and 2500 Myr, and Lesser Himalaya sequence has age peaks at ~1800 Ma and 2600 Ma. By simply comparing the foreland basin record with source area record, we cam see that Amile formation resemble age distribution of Lesser Himalaya. It has about 20 grains with age ~1800 Myr (Paleoproterozoic) and about 16 grains yield age of ~2600 Myr (Archean). Then we can interpret that sediments of Amile formation are mainly derived from the Lesser Himalaya, and rocks yield ago of Paleoproterozoic and Archean are from the Indian craton. So the story is: Indian plate collide with Tibet, rocks of Indian craton deformed and involved into Himalayan thrust belt (e.g. Lesser Himalaya sequence), then eroded and deposited at foreland basin.

U–Pb geochronology of zircons was conducted by laser ablation multicollector inductively coupled plasma mass spectrometry (LA-MC-ICPMS).

Bulk sediment Nd and Sr 

Depend on properties of Sm–Nd radioactive isotope system can provide age estimation of sedimentary source rocks. It has been used in provenance studies. 143Nd is produced by α decay of 147Sm and has a half life of 1.06×1011 years. Variation of 143Nd/144Nd is caused by decay of 147Sm. Now Sm/Nd rato of the mantle is higher than that of the crust and 143Nd/144Nd ratio is also higher than in the mantle than in the crust. 143Nd/144Nd ratio is expressed in εNd notation (DePaolo and Wasserbur 1976). . CHUR refer to Chondritic Uniform Reservoir. So ϵNd is a function of T (time). Nd isotope evolution in mantle and crust in shown in the figure to the right. The upper plot (a), bold line shows the evolution of the bulk earth or CHUR(chondritic uniform reservoir). The lower plot (b) shows evolution of bulk earth (CHUR) crust and mantle, 143Nd/144Nd is transformed to εNd. Normally, the most rocks have εNd values in the range of -20 to +10. Calculated εNd value of rocks can be correlated to source rocks to perform provenance studies.What's more, Sr and Nd isotopes have been used to study both provenance and weathering intensity. Nd is mainly unaffected by weathering process but 87Sr/86Sr value is more affected by chemical weathering.

Lab data acquisition and instruments 

To pick suitable lab data acquisition to sediment provenance, grain size should be taken into consideration. For conglomerates and boulders, as original mineral paragenesis is preserved, almost all analytical methods can be used to study the provenance. For finer grained sediments, as they always lose paragenetic information, only a limited range of analytical methods can be used.

Lab data acquisition approaches for provenance study fall into the following three categories: (1) analyzing bulk composition to extract petrographic, mineralogical and chemical information. (2) analyzing specific groups of minerals such as heavy minerals and (3) analyzing single mineral grains about morphological, chemical and isotopic properties.

For bulk composition analysis, samples are crushed, powdered and disintegrated or melted. Then measurement of major and trace and rare-earth (REE) elements are conducted by using instruments like atomic absorption spectroscopy (AAS), X-ray fluorescence(XRF), neutron activation analysis (NAA) etc.

Sand-sized sediments are able to be analyzed by single-grain methods. Single-grain methods can be divided into the following three groups: (1) Microscopic-morphological techniques, which are used to observe shape, color and internal structures in minerals. For example, scanning electron microscope (SEM) and cathodoluminescence (CL) detector. (2) Single grain geochemical techniques, which are used to acquire chemical composition and variations within minerals. For example, laser-ablation inductively coupled plasma mass spectrometry (ICP-MS). (3) Radiometric dating of single grain mineral, which can determine the geochronological and thermochronological properties of minerals. For example, U/Pb SHRIMP dating and 40Ar/39Ar laser-probe dating.

Problems and limitations of provenance studies 

During the pathway of detritus transported from source area to basin, the detritus is subject to weathering, transporting, mixing, deposition, diagenesis and recycling. The complicated process can modify parents lithology both compositionally and textually. All these factors pose certain limits on our capability to restore the characteristics of source rocks from the properties of the produced detrital record. The following paragraphs briefly introduce major problems and limitations of provenance studies.

Candidate source area 
To correlate sediments (detrital record) to source area, several possible source area need to be chosen for comparison. In this process, possible source area where sediment is from may be missed and not chosen as a candidate source area. This could cause misinterpretation in correlation sediment to source later.

Grain size 
Grain size could cause misinterpretation of provenance studies. During transportation and deposition, detritus is subject to mechanical breakdown, chemical alternation and sorting. This always results in a preferential enrichment of specific materials in a certain range of grain-size, and sediment composition tends to be a function of grain size. For instance, SiO2/Al2O3 ratios decrease with decreasing of grain size because Al-rich phyllosilicate enriches at the expense of Si-rich phase in fine-grained detritus. This means the changing of composition of detrital record could reflect effect of sorting of grain size and not only changing of provenance. To minimize the influence of sedimentary sorting on provenance method (like Sr-Nd isotopic method), only very fine-grained to fine-grained sandstones are collected as samples but medium-grained sandstones can be used when alternatives are unavailable.

Mixing of detritus 
Mixing of detritus from multiple sources may cause problems with correlating the final detrital record to source rocks, especially when dispersal pathways are complex and involve recycling of previously deposited sediments. For example, in a detrital record, there are zircon grains with the age of 1.0 billion years, but there are two source areas upstream that yield 1.0 billion years old zircon and rivers drained through both area. Then we couldn't determine which area the detritus is derived from.

Diagenesis 
Diagenesis could be a problem when analyzing detrital records especially when dealing with ancient sediments which are always lithified. Variation of clay minerals in detrital record may not reflect variation of provenance rock, but burial effect. For example, clay minerals become unstable at great depth, kaolinite and smectite become illte. If there is a downward increasing trend of illite components in a drilling core, we can not conclude that early detrital record indicate more illite-yield source rock but possibly as a result of burial and alternation of minerals

Hinterland structural assumption 

As a provenance study tries to correlate detrital record (which is stored in basins) to hinterland stratigraphy, and hinterland stratigraphy is structurally controlled by fault systems, so hinterland structural setting is important to interpretation of the detrital record. Hinterland structural setting is estimated by field mapping work. Geologists work along river valleys and traverse mountain belts (thrust belt), locate major faults and describe major stratigraphy bounded by faults in the area. A geologic map is the product of field mapping work, and cross sections can be constructed by interpreting a geologic map. However, a lot of assumptions are made during this process, so the hinterland structural settings are always assumptions. And these assumptions can affect interpretation of detrital record. Here is an example, the right figure shows a classic thrust belt and foreland basin system, the thrust fault carries overlying rocks to the surface and rocks of various lithology are eroded and transported to deposit at the foreland basin. In structural assumption 1, the pink layer is assumed to exist above thrust 2 and thrust 3, but in the 2nd assumption, the pink layer is only carried by thrust 2. Detrital records are stored in foreland basin stratigraphy. Within the stratigraphy, the pink layer is correlated to the hinterland pink layer. If we use structural assumption 2, we can interpret that thrust 2 was active about 12 and 5 million years ago. But when using the other assumption, we couldn't know if the pink layer record indicates activity of thrust 2 or 3.

Sediment provenance studies in hydrocarbon exploration and production 
A combination usage of multiple provenance methods (e.g.petrography, heavy mineral analysis, mineral geochemistry, wholerock geochemistry, geochronology and drainage capture analysis)can provide valuable insights to all stages of hydrocarbon exploration and production. In exploration stage, provenance studies can enhance the understanding of reservoir distribution and reservoir quality. These will affect chance of success of exploration project; In development stage, mineralogical and chemical techniques are widely used to estimate reservoir zonation and correlation of stratigraphy. At the same time, these provenance techniques are also used in production stage. For example, they are used to assess permeability variations and well decline rate resulting from spatial variability in diagenesis and depositional facies

See also 
Uranium–lead dating
Petrology
Mineralogy
Heavy mineral

References

External links 
Arizona Laserchron Center, Department of Geosciences, University of Arizona
Geochemical Instrumentation and Analysis
Sample preparation by UCLA SIM lab
Diagenesis and Reservoir Quality - by Schlumberger

Geology